Indian Village Historic District may refer to:

Indian Village Historic District (Fort Wayne, Indiana), listed on the National Register of Historic Places (NRHP)
 Indian Village Historic District (Detroit, Michigan), NRHP-listed

See also
 Indian Village (disambiguation)